The Manuel L. Quezon University (MLQU) is a private, nonsectarian, coeducational basic and higher education institution in Diliman, Quezon City, Philippines. It is named after the second president of the Philippine  Manuel L. Quezon.

History
On November 1, 1947, eighteen professors and Six co-founders included Assoc. Justice Jose Benedicto "JBL" L. Reyes, Sen. Lorenzo M. Tanada Sr., Dr. Leoncio B. Monzon, Justice Arsenio P. Dizon from the school where Dr. Monzon served first president and as Dean joined him in an old MLQ School of Law Building at the corner of Mendiola and Legarda Streets to begin training 643 students for the law profession. Thus was born the MLQU School of Law.

The fledgling school produced its first batch of graduates the following year and in the Bar Examinations given in that same year, the school registered a passing average of 97.5%. In 1949, it exceeded its first record with a passing average of 100% with three of its graduates making it to the Top Ten.

The law school soon found it necessary to transfer to a new site on R. Hidalgo St. where other academic units were organized beginning with the School of Arts and Sciences followed by the School of Education, Commerce and Business Administration, Engineering, Architecture and Graduate Studies. With the addition of these units, the Law school became the Manuel L. Quezon Educational Institution. In 1958, the institution acquired University status.

Subsequently, the Schools of Criminology, Architecture and Secretarial Education were separated from the School of Arts and Sciences, Engineering and Commerce and Business Administration, respectively. The School of Information Technology is the latest addition to the university community.

The Manuel L. Quezon University has two campuses, namely, the Monzon Hall, located at 916 R. Hidalgo Street, Quiapo and the Arlegui Compound at Arlegui St. where the Basic Education Department is located. Just recently, the Research Center was built adjacent to the Monzon Hall and which was named after Justice Arsenio P. Dizon.

Move to Quezon City and expansion

In August 2014, construction magnate and New San Jose Builders Inc. chairman Jose Acuzar acquired ownership of the 69-year-old university for an undisclosed amount and a year later opened the School for Professional Advancement and Continuing Education (SPACE) inside the Victoria Sports Tower Condominium along Epifanio de los Santos Avenue signaling the university's entry to the roster of esteemed academic institutions in Quezon City.

On the occasion of Quezon City day and 138th birth anniversary of Manuel L. Quezon, the university officially moved from Quiapo, Manila to Victoria Sports Tower on August 19, 2016, dubbed "Manuel is Home in Quezon City". Two (2) more locations will be added in nearby Timog Avenue and the former site of Bureau of Research and Standards under the DPWH to offer more tertiary courses to potential students and alumni alike.

Notable people

 Blas F. Ople - Former Senate President
 Wigberto Tañada- Senator, Republic of the Philippines
 Alberto Romulo - Senator, Secretary of Foreign Affairs, and Executive Secretary of the Republic of the Philippines.
 Roberto A. Abad - AB '60, Supreme Court of the Philippines Associate Justice (Retired)
 Isagani Cruz - LLb '51, School of Law, Supreme Court of the Philippines Associate Justice (Retired)
 Jose Melo - chairman, Commission on Elections (Philippines); retired Supreme Court Associate Justice
 Ruben T. Reyes - Supreme Court of the Philippines Associate Justice (Retired)
 Martin Villarama- Former Supreme Court Associate Justice
 Benjamin Abalos- chairman, Commission on Elections. Chairman of Metro Manila Development Authority (MMDA).
 Amparo Cabotaje Tang - AB '75, Political Science, Presiding Justice Sandiganbayan
 Gregory S. Ong - Associate Justice, dismissed Sandiganbayan, Quezon City
 Rosalinda Baldoz - Secretary of Labor and Employment
 Silvestre Bello III- Secretary of Labor and Employment.
 Roberto Pagdanganan- Philippine Tourism Secretary and Governor of Bulacan Province.
 Antonio Villegas - Mayor, City of Manila
 Jamalul Kiram III - Sultan of Sulu
 Guillermo de Vega - Chairman of the Board of Cendors for Motion  Pictures (now MTRCB)
 Rustica Carpio - Decorated actress, academic, and public servant

See also
 Quezon City Academy

References

External links

 
1947 establishments in the Philippines
Education in Quiapo, Manila
Educational institutions established in 1947
Quezon family
Schools in Quezon City
Universities and colleges in Manila
Universities and colleges in Quezon City